Singur Reservoir is a reservoir formed by back waters of Singur Dam located  on Manjira River in Medak District, Telangana, India. It is a sustained drinking water source of Hyderabad city.

References

Reservoirs in Telangana
Medak district
Year of establishment missing